Organon & Co. is  an American pharmaceutical company headquartered in Jersey City, New Jersey. Organon specializes in the following core therapeutic fields: reproductive medicine, contraception, psychiatry, hormone replacement therapy (HRT), and anesthesia. Organon sells to international markets.

History
Organon was founded by Dr. Saal van Zwanenberg in Oss, the Netherlands, in 1923 as a separate part of the meat factory Zwanenberg's fabrieken. Its first product was insulin in 1923. In the thirties it manufactured estrogens.

In 1948, Organon acquired the Newhouse research site in Scotland, United Kingdom. The production of cortisone was initiated in 1953.

In 1962, it bought the stock of the Nederlandsche Cocaïnefabriek. The company name was changed to Koninklijke Zwanenberg-Organon (KZO), and it merged with the fibre producer AKU in 1969 to become AKZO, later Akzo Nobel. Organon was the human health care business unit of Akzo Nobel. In 2004, Organon acquired active-pharmaceutical-ingredient producer Diosynth. 

In November 2007, Schering-Plough acquired Organon BioSciences and veterinary pharmaceutical company Intervet from Akzo Nobel. Schering-Plough transferred Organon to its headquarters in New Jersey. Two years later, Schering-Plough merged with Merck & Co., known as Merck Sharp & Dohme or MSD outside the United States and Canada.

In May 2020, Merck & Co. announced that Organon & Co. will be the name of "the pending spin-off of its women’s health, legacy products, and biosimilars businesses, which the company says is on track to be completed by the end of the first half in 2021." Merck completed the spinoff and Organon & Co. became a publicly traded company on 3 June 2021. A copy of the Information Statement sent to Merck shareholders was filed with the U.S. SEC on April 20, 2021 in a Form 10-12B/A, Exhibit 99.1  </ref>

In November 2021, the business announced it would acquire Forendo Pharma and its lead compound, a potentially first-in-class oral 17β-hydroxysteroid dehydrogenase type 1 inhibitor.

Products
Products include: Esmirtazapine, Remeron, Remeron SolTab, Sustanon, Deca-Durabolin, Pregnyl, Implanon, NuvaRing, Marvelon, Desolett and a variety of other contraceptive products.

Research compounds
During its period of independent operation, Organon developed a large number of compounds which were never adopted for medical use, but continue to be used for a variety of scientific research. Notable compounds include:

 Org 12962
 Org 20599
 Org 21465
 Org 25435
 Org 25935
 Org 26576
 Org 27569
 Org 28312
 Org 28611
 Org 37684

Medicaid fraud 
In 2007, whistleblower lawsuits were filed against Organon in federal courts in Massachusetts and Texas. Organon was accused of selling its anti-depression medication Remeron at a discount to nursing home pharmacies (in order to encourage use), yet filing claims to Medicare for reimbursement at the full, undiscounted price. Organon agreed to settle the case for $31 million in October 2014.

References

External links

Merck announces Organon as name for new spinoff
Photo of Organon Insulin carton, 1930
Report to the Insulin Committee on Insulins in Europe, 1925 (University of Toronto)-page 26-Organon

Companies listed on the New York Stock Exchange
Corporate spin-offs
Schering-Plough
Pharmaceutical companies based in New Jersey
Biotechnology companies of the United States
Companies based in Jersey City, New Jersey
Pharmaceutical companies established in 1923
2007 mergers and acquisitions
Companies based in North Brabant
Oss
Dutch companies established in 1923